Hunt Hill is a mountain located in the Catskill Mountains of New York south of Andes. Hemlock Knoll is located north, and Mary Smith Hill is located southwest of Hunt Hill.

References

Mountains of Delaware County, New York
Mountains of New York (state)